Christopher Andrew Egan (born 29 June 1984) is an Australian actor. He played Nick Smith in the Australian soap opera Home and Away from 2000 to 2003, and David Shepherd on the NBC television drama Kings. He also portrayed Alex Lannon in the Apocalyptic TV series, Dominion.

Life and career
Egan was born in Sydney, New South Wales, Australia. He has appeared in several commercials and did some modelling, but his ability and ambition for acting came out when he performed in the Glen Street productions of Les Misérables and West Side Story. He also appeared in the TV soap Home and Away.

He has also been trained in gymnastics at the KICK Performance Group in Sydney. As well as competing in several eisteddfods at an early age, Egan has been able to use his gymnastics skills extensively in the thriller film Crush.

He moved to Los Angeles in 2003. In 2006, he appeared in the film adaptation of Christopher Paolini's novel Eragon. In 2007, he played a small role in Resident Evil: Extinction, the third movie in the Resident Evil series. In the summer of 2009, he shot the movie Letters to Juliet in Italy, with Amanda Seyfried, Vanessa Redgrave and Gael García Bernal.

Egan starred in Dominion, the Sci Fi supernatural action drama based on characters from the 2010 feature film Legion that starred Paul Bettany. Egan played Alex Lannon, a rebellious young soldier who discovers he is the unlikely savior of humanity.

Filmography

Film

Television

References

External links

1984 births
Living people
Australian male child actors
Australian male film actors
Australian male models
Models from Sydney
Australian male soap opera actors
Male actors from Sydney
20th-century Australian male actors
21st-century Australian male actors